Clanmaurice (Clann Mhuiris) is a barony in County Kerry, Ireland. It contains 16 Parishes and it is roughly 485 km2.

Parishes
Ardfert
Ballyheigue
Duagh
Dysert (Partly in Trughanacmy)
Finuge
Kilcarragh
Kilfeighny
Kilflyn
Killahan
Killury
Kilmoyley
Kilshenane
Kiltomy
Listowel
O'Dorney
Rattoo

See also
List of baronies of Ireland
County Kerry

References
Barony Map of Ireland
GENUKI: Kerry, Baronies

Baronies of County Kerry